Kieran Creagh, is an Irish Passionist priest, from Belfast, who survived being shot while working in South Africa, where he had founded a hospice (Leratong meaning place of love) to help sufferers of HIV/Aids.

Born in Belfast to Kate and Jim Creagh, Kieran studied in Queens University, Belfast, and at the age of 23 joined the Passionist order. He continued his studies, in the Milltown Institute in Dublin.

Fr. Kieran was the first person in Africa to be injected with a trial HIV vaccine, in 2004 he was named, Irish International Personality of the Year.

In February 2007, he was shot three times in his home, he survived, and his attackers were convicted. He returned to South Africa following his recovery but eventually, he returned to Ireland. He learned the Irish Language and ministered from 2012 until 2016 on Tory Island, Co. Donegal.

In 2016 Fr. Creagh was appointed to Holy Cross in Ardoyne, in Belfast.

Creagh's father, Jim Creagh, was a former UTV and Irish News journalist and his brother Liam Creagh is a journalist who has worked with BBC and Sky News.

References

Living people
Year of birth missing (living people)
Irish priests
Passionists
Alumni of Milltown Institute of Theology and Philosophy
Alumni of Queen's University Belfast
People from County Antrim